Penelope Marshall (born 27 July 1989) is a New Zealand representative swimmer. She won the silver medal in the 4 × 200 m freestyle relay at the 2010 Commonwealth Games alongside Lauren Boyle, Amaka Gessler and Natasha Hind. She won the bronze medal with the same team in the 4 × 100 m freestyle relay at the same Games.  She competed for New Zealand at the 2012 Summer Olympics in the women's  freestyle relay.

References

1989 births
Living people
New Zealand female swimmers
Olympic swimmers of New Zealand
Swimmers at the 2012 Summer Olympics
Commonwealth Games silver medallists for New Zealand
Commonwealth Games bronze medallists for New Zealand
Swimmers at the 2010 Commonwealth Games
Commonwealth Games medallists in swimming
Sportspeople from Tauranga
Medallists at the 2010 Commonwealth Games